Trypanidius is a genus of longhorn beetles of the subfamily Lamiinae, containing 15 described species.

Species
 Trypanidius albosignatus (Melzer, 1932)
 Trypanidius andicola Blanchard, 1847
 Trypanidius apicalis Aurivillius, 1921
 Trypanidius dimidiatus Thomson, 1860
 Trypanidius insularis Fisher, 1925
 Trypanidius irroratus Monné & Delfino, 1980
 Trypanidius isolatus Waterhouse, 1890
 Trypanidius kitayamai Bezark, 2019
 Trypanidius maculatus Monné & Delfino, 1980
 Trypanidius mexicanus Thomson, 1860
 Trypanidius mimicavus Carelli, Monné & Souza, 2013
 Trypanidius notatus (Fabricius, 1787)
 Trypanidius proximus Melzer, 1931
 Trypanidius rubripes Bates, 1872
 Trypanidius spilmani Villiers, 1980

References

Acanthocinini